The St. Landry Parish School Board is located in Opelousas, Louisiana. The St. Landry Parish School District is rated a C district. Mr. Patrick Jenkins is the superintendent of the St. Landry Parish School System.

Schools
The St. Landry Parish School Board operates 36 public schools, including 23 elementary schools, two middle schools, seven high schools, and four alternative programs.

Elementary schools

Arnaudville Elementary SchoolCankton ElementaryCentral Middle SchoolEast ElementaryEunice ElementaryGlendale ElementaryGrand Coteau ElementaryGrand Prairie ElementaryGrolee Elementary SchoolHighland Elementary SchoolKrotz Springs Elementary SchoolLawtell Elementary SchoolLeonville Elementary SchoolNorth Elementary SchoolNortheast Elementary SchoolPalmetto Elementary SchoolPark Vista Elementary SchoolPlaisance Elementary SchoolPort Barre Elementary SchoolSouth Street Elementary SchoolSouthwest Elementary SchoolSunset Elementary SchoolWashington Elementary School

Junior high schools

Eunice Jr. High SchoolOpelousas Jr. High School

High schools

Beau Chene High SchoolEunice High SchoolNorth Central High SchoolNorthwest High SchoolOpelousas Sr. High SchoolPort Barre High SchoolMagnet Academy for Cultural Arts (MACA)

Alternative Programs

Eunice Career and Technical CenterSt. Landry Accelerated Transition School (SLATS)Center for Academic Programs (CAPS)Washington Career and Technical Education Center

Superintendent

On May 4, 1878, the Board of Public School Directors of St. Landry Parish published the duties regulating the Parish Superintendent of Education, "an office lately instituted by our Parish Board." The position of Superintendent of Schools for St. Landry Parish was created in 1878.

References

External links
St. Landry Parish School Board

School districts in Louisiana
Education in St. Landry Parish, Louisiana